Steel Panthers II: Modern Battles is a 1996 computer wargame developed and published by Strategic Simulations. It is the sequel to Steel Panthers and the second entry in the Steel Panthers series. The game was designed by Gary Grigsby and Keith Brors.

Like its predecessor, Steel Panthers II was a commercial hit.

Gameplay
Steel Panthers II is a computer wargame that simulates modern warfare.

Development
A key goal for Steel Panthers II was offering improved animation. The game was released on November 1, 1996.

Reception

Following Steel Panthers strong commercial performance, Steel Panthers II was a "major success", according to author Rusel DeMaria. Among other theories, he speculated that the deployment of tanks in Operation Desert Storm could have influenced its sales. Steel Panthers II was nominated as Computer Games Strategy Pluss 1996 wargame of the year, although it lost to that year's Battleground games: Shiloh, Antietam and Waterloo. It was also a nominee for CNET Gamecenter's "Strategy Game of the Year" award, which went to Civilization II.

William R. Trotter of PC Gamer US was largely positive toward Steel Panthers II, but felt that it was held back by its technical problems, glitches and oversights. He concluded, "If not for the numerous little flaws that keep it from realizing its own best intentions, this would have been my nominee for Wargame of the Year." In Computer Games Strategy Plus, Robert Mayer was less impressed: he considered it visually impressive but unrealistic, with numerous historical oversights. He nevertheless called it "a worthy successor to a very successful game".

Steel Panthers and Steel Panthers II were named, collectively, the 62nd best computer game ever by PC Gamer UK in 1997.

Legacy
The game was followed by Steel Panthers III: Brigade Command 1939-1999. The Camo Workshop released a mod based on Steel Panthers II called SP2WW2 (Steel Panthers II: World War 2) in 1998.

References

External links
Steel Panthers II: Modern Battles at MobyGames

1996 video games
Alternate history video games
DOS games
DOS-only games
Computer wargames
Gulf War video games
Korean War video games
Multiplayer and single-player video games
Strategic Simulations games
Tank simulation video games
Video game sequels
Video games developed in the United States
Video games set in the 1950s
Video games set in the 1970s
Video games set in 1980
Video games set in 1997
Video games set in 1998
Video games set in Germany
Video games set in Israel
Video games set in Japan
Video games set in Korea
Video games set in Syria
Video games set in Taiwan